The 2004–05 season was Bihor Oradea's 46th season in the Romanian football league system, and their 26th season in the Divizia B. At the end of the season the team finished on 3rd place, far away from the promotion place, which was the goal of the team at the start of the season. The season was a tumultuous one for the management, technical staff and players, the club's management being vehemently criticized for defective management and being dismissed with 5 rounds before the end of the season. Also 3 head coaches were changed during this season. This was the last season when FC Bihor was known as FC Oradea.

First team squad

Pre-season and friendlies

Competitions

Seria III

Result round by round

Results

Cupa României

See also

2004–05 Cupa României
Divizia B

Notes and references

FC Bihor Oradea seasons
FC Bihor Oradea